The Abu Dhabi National Oil Company or ADNOC is the State-owned oil company of the United Arab Emirates (UAE). It is the world's 12th largest oil company by production. As of 2021, the company has an oil production capacity exceeding 4 million b/d with plans to increase to 5 million bpd by 2030. It is the United Arab Emirate's largest oil company.

ADNOC's output has been roughly flat at about 2.5 million barrels per day during the 1990s. It stood at 2.9 mbpd in 2008. Although its financial indicators are difficult to assess as the company has been described as secretive, it has also been described as efficient and well managed. ADNOC is one of few oil companies in the world to make a substantial investment to increase oil production amid growing pressure to reduce output due to climate change, which according to the company is necessary as oil and gas continues to power the world economy and to prevent price shocks in natural gas and oil caused by premature cuts in investment. In an effort to adapt to climate needs, ADNOC is planning the large scale production of hydrogen fuel as a clean energy fuel to replace oil exports.

History

In November 2019 ADNOC received approval from the emirate’s Supreme Petroleum Council to list its flagship Murban crude oil as a futures contract on an international stock exchange. Murban is a highly prized grade of crude oil that accounts for about half of the UAE’s total oil output of about 3 million barrels per day.

A joint venture between ADNOC and holding company ADQ was launched in July 2020 to invest in chemicals projects in the planned Ruwais Derivatives Park. ADNOC will have a 60% stake while ADQ will hold a 40% share.

In December 2021, ADNOC and Abu Dhabi National Energy Company PJSC (TAQA) announced a $3.6 billion project to aim to reduce the carbon footprint of ADNOC's offshore production operations by more than 30%.

In December 2022, it was announced ADNOC had acquired a 24.9% stake in Austrian integrated oil, gas, and petrochemical company, OMV.

Operations
As of November 2019, the UAE holds the sixth-largest proven reserves of oil in the world at 105 billion barrels. Most of these reserves are located in Abu Dhabi.

ADNOC is one of the world's largest energy companies measured by both reserves and production. ADNOC has 16 subsidiary companies in upstream, midstream, and downstream stages of production. ADNOC develops both onshore and offshore gas fields. The company operates two oil refineries, Ruwais and Umm Al Nar. ADNOC exports natural gas in the form of liquefied natural gas (LNG) in addition to producing supplies for local electricity and water utilities, to other domestic industries including petrochemicals plants, and for re-injection into reservoirs.

Foreign direct investment 
Major investments were made to ADNOC in 2019 by US asset managers BlackRock and KKR Global and Italian investment firm Eni SpA. The US firms acquired about 40% of ADNOC's pipeline assets for about $4 billion while Eni SpA took a 20% stake in Abu Dhabi Oil Refining Company for over $3 billion. Austria's OMV also invested about $2.8 billion, about 15% in ADNOC's refining business in partnership with Eni SpA.

Singapore's sovereign wealth fund GIC completed a deal with ADNOC in May 2019 that gives GIC a 6% share in ADNOC's pipeline infrastructure. The deal is valued at $600 million.

Headquarters
ADNOC Headquarters is a skyscraper office complex located in Abu Dhabi. The building incorporates energy efficiency and sustainable engineering technologies, such as a double skin façade, photovoltaic glazing, LED exterior lighting. Designed by HOK, the overall building complex consists of more than 65 floors with an office tower, corniche club, crisis management center, a heritage museum, and other support facilities. It was opened a few years ago.

Leadership and corporate governance

Sultan Ahmed Al Jaber

Sultan Ahmed Al Jaber is Minister Industry and Advanced Technology in the United Arab Emirates,  CEO of the Abu Dhabi National Oil Company, the chairman of Masdar, a company located in Abu Dhabi specializing in clean technology, renewable energy, and sustainable development and the chairman of Abu Dhabi Ports. He was appointed the chairman of the Board of Directors of the Emirates Development Bank in September 2020.  He serves as the UAE's special envoy for energy and climate change.

In 2013, Dr. Al Jaber was named Minister of State and joined the UAE cabinet. Dr. Al Jaber's appointment was approved by Sheikh Khalifa bin Zayed Al Nahyan, the UAE's president. Speaking of the appointment of Dr. Al Jaber and other ministers, Sheikh Mohammed bin Rashid Al Maktoum, the UAE's vice president and prime minister and ruler of Dubai, said the new cabinet has "young faces with new ideas and energy to keep up with the rapid changes and to deal with our people's top priorities."

Al Jaber holds a BSc in Chemical Engineering from the University of Southern California the United States and a Ph.D. in business and economics from Coventry University in the United Kingdom and an MBA from the California State University at Los Angeles.

After his appointment, Al Jaber revealed a plan to modernize ADNOC and make its operations more profitable. The plan includes streamlining ADNOC's operations to improve profitability and working to create a more commercially minded culture among the firm's employees; the goal is to put the quality of ADNOC's operations on equal footing with large multinationals while ensuring that the firm continues to help the UAE diversify its economy. As part of this effort, a master plan is being implemented to better coordinate upstream and downstream gas operations among ADNOC's many subsidiaries in order to more effectively meet the UAE's rising demand for natural gas. Maximizing profitability in upstream operations is another key priority. Under this plan ADNOC is also looking for ways to better coordinate downstream activity and create new products. Executive compensation has now been tied to key performance indicators and commercial benchmarks, especially operating cost per barrel. Al Jaber's plan will be implemented over several years. It is a part of the government's plan for economic diversification embodied in Economic Vision 2030.

On 13 February 2023, ADNOC Drilling, under the chairmanship of Al Jaber presented record profits and plans to help expand fossil fuel production, which Amnesty said was entirely incompatible with Al Jaber’s role as president-designate of COP28. Amnesty International’s Programme Director for Climate, Economic and Social Justice, and Corporate Accountability, Marta Schaaf criticized Al-Jaber’s role as the leader of COP28, since his Emirati oil company was planning to cause more climate damage.

Supreme Petroleum Council

The Supreme Petroleum Council is the highest governing body of oil, gas, and similar industry-related activities in the Abu Dhabi. The council was formed in 1988. The council is tasked with supervising all oil and gas companies that operate in Abu Dhabi and the United Arab Emirates and acts as the board of directors for ADNOC.

Operating companies
ADNOC operates numerous companies with different functions, including exploration and production; processing and refining; marketing and distribution.

Exploration and production of oil and gas

ADNOC Onshore
ADNOC Onshore works onshore and in shallow coastal water. It is previously known as Abu Dhabi Company for Onshore Petroleum Operations, ADCO. ADNOC Onshore operates primarily in Abu Dhabi. The company was originally known as Petroleum Development (Trucial Coast). It received its first concession on January 11, 1939, but did not begin geological operations until after World War II. The first commercially viable oil discovery was made at Bab in 1960. In 1962, the company was renamed the Abu Dhabi Petroleum Company. Exports began to flow from the Jebel Dhanna terminal on December 14, 1963. Abu Dhabi's government acquired 25% equity in the company in 1973 and increased its stake to 60% in 1974. The company started using the name Abu Dhabi Company for Onshore Petroleum Operations, ADCO, in 1978. ADNOC Onshore's primary exports from the Jebel Dhanna and Fujairah terminals. ADNOC have a 60% share, the remaining 40% is split (CNPC (8%), BP (10%), Total (10%), Inpex (5%), CEFC (4%) and GS Energy of South Korea (3%)). In December 2018 ADNOC transferred China Energy’s stake in onshore to China ZhenHua Oil Company, awarding the company a 4% stake.

ADNOC Offshore 
ADNOC Offshore is the largest offshore oil producer in Abu Dhabi. It is ADNOC's dedicated offshore arm and is responsible for the development and delivery of oil and gas resources in Abu Dhabi waters. It was formed through the consolidation of two of ADNOC's upstream oil and gas companies: Abu Dhabi Marine Area Operating Company (ADMA-OPCO) and Zakum Development Company (ZADCO). With reorganisation, and the expiry of the 65-year-old ADMA concessions, the offshore concessions are now split by fields. ADNOC 60% then the 40% is split into Upper Zakum (Exxon / INPEX), (minor fields Umm Al Dalk, Satah (Inpex 40%)), Lower Zakum (Total, ENI, ONGC, INPEX), Umm Shaif and Nasr (Total, ENI), Sarb and Umm Lulu (CEPSA, OMV).

ADNOC Drilling
ADNOC Drilling is ADNOC's oldest subsidiary. It was previously known as National Drilling Company, NDC. ADNOC Drilling is the largest drilling company in the Middle East. It drills for oil both onshore and offshore in Abu Dhabi. ADNOC currently has a 95% equity in ADNOC Drilling after energy services giant Baker Hughes, acquired a 5% stake (valued around $11 billion or AED40.4 billion) in 2018.

In September 2021, ADNOC Drilling announced its intention to list another 11% of shares in the company on the Abu Dhabi Securities Exchange (ADX) through an Initial Public Offering (IPO). On October 3, 2021, the company went public on the Abu Dhabi bourse, and became the most successful listing of all time in the emirate, jumping 30% on its first-ever day of trading.

Al Yasat Petroleum 
Al Yasat Petroleum is ADNOC's youngest operating company. It is the first joint venture between ADNOC and China National Petroleum Corporation (CNPC), established in 2014. Tayba Al Hashemi is the current CEO of Al Yasat Petroleum. Al Yasat's role is to explore oil and gas potential within the company's mandated concession areas and to develop prospective locations on behalf of the company's shareholders. ADNOC is the majority shareholder and owns 60% of the company, with CNPC owning the remaining 40%.

Al Dhafra Petroleum 
Al Dhafra Petroleum is an emerging upstream company that is focused on unlocking undeveloped oil and gas potential in the UAE. Al Dhafra Petroleum is a dynamic and efficient upstream company with a mandate to maximize the UAE's natural resources. Its shareholders are ADNOC, which owns 60% of the company, with Korea National Oil Corporation (KNOC) and GS Energy owning the remaining 40%.

ADNOC Sour Gas 
ADNOC Sour Gas is a joint $10 billion venture between ADNOC and Occidental Petroleum that is expected to extract at least one billion cubic feet of ultra-sour gas per day. On a daily basis, the project is also expected to produce 504 million cubic feet of natural gas, 33,000 barrels of condensates, and thousands of tons of natural gas liquids, and thousands of tons of sulphur granules. The Project is located in the Shah gas field about 210 kilometers west of Abu Dhabi. Half of this field's production will be used to service domestic demand in the UAE and minimize the need for gas imports. ADNOC Sour Gas is 60% owned by ADNOC with the remaining equity held by Occidental. It is previously known as Abu Dhabi Gas Development Company Limited (Al Hosn Gas).

Processing, refining and chemicals

ADNOC Gas Processing 
ADNOC Gas Processing is a natural gas producer. It is formerly known as Abu Dhabi Gas Industries Limited (GASCO). ADNOC owns 68 percent equity in ADNOC Gas Processing. Other shareholders are Shell Abu Dhabi with 15 percent equity, Total also with 15 percent, and Partex with 2 percent. The company was established in 1975.

ADNOC LNG 
ADNOC LNG processes and distributes liquefied petroleum gas and liquified natural gas. ADNOC Gas Processing supplies products to ADNOC LNG at Das Island where it is processed and loaded on ships for export to East Asia, especially Japan. ADNOC is the majority shareholder. Minority shares are held by Mitsui, BP, and Total. It is formerly called Abu Dhabi Gas Liquefaction Co. Limited (ADGAS).

ADNOC Refining 
ADNOC Refining was created in 1999 to takeover oil refining from ADNOC. ADNOC Refining refines crude oil and condensate, various petroleum products, and granulated sulphur. It operates the Ruwais and Abu Dhabi refineries. In 2015, it completed a major expansion of its Ruwais Refinery. The $10 billion project doubled the capacity of the facility. A large part of the increased output is dedicated to diesel production due to demand from Asia. Ruwais has the ability to refine 600,000 tonnes of high-quality base oils per year. These oils are used primarily for automotive lubricants. It is previously known as Abu Dhabi Oil Refining Company (TAKREER).

Fertiglobe 
In September 2019 Fertiglobe was formed as a result of the merger of ADNOC Fertilizers, (established in 1980) with Dutch firm OCI's Middle East nitrogen fertilizer business. ADNOC has a 42% stake in the new business.

ADNOC Industrial Gas 
ADNOC Industrial Gas was founded in 2007. It manufactures industrial gas used in the oil, gas, and petrochemical industries. ADNOC Industrial Gas works very closely with ADNOC Gas Processing. The firm is a joint-venture between ADNOC and the Linde Group of Germany. ADNOC holds 51% equity with the remainder held by Linde. It is formerly known as ADNOC Linde Industrial Gases Company Limited (ELIXIER).

Abu Dhabi Polymers Company (Borouge)

Borouge is a manufacturer of polyolefins. It is a joint venture of ADNOC and Borealis of Austria. It was founded in 1998, and has two divisions, one based in Abu Dhabi and another based in Singapore. The company supplies polyolefin plastics (polyethylene and polypropylene). They focus on differentiated high-end applications in the Middle East and Asia Pacific with Borstar Enhanced Polyethylene produced in Abu Dhabi and the Borealis range of specialty products.

Marketing and distribution

ADNOC Logistics & Services 
ADNOC Logistics & Services was formed by merging ESNAAD, IRSHAD, and ADNATCO. ADNOC Logistics & Services is 100% owned by ADNOC. The new company has a workforce of about 4,000 people.

In August 2020, Chinese company Wanhua partnered with ADNOC Logistics and Services to create AW Shipping Ltd., which owns and operates product tankers and a flotilla of very large gas carriers (VLGCs). AW Shipping delivers liquefied petroleum gas (LPG) from ADNOC and other global suppliers to Wanhua's sites in China and globally. In November 2018, a 10-year contract for (LPG) supply was forged between the companies.

ADNOC Distribution
ADNOC Distribution (ADNOCDIS:UH) operates hundreds of service stations across the UAE, provides bunkering services at Zayed Port, aviation fuel services at most of the country's airports, and sells its own brand of lubricants throughout the Gulf region. In September 2020 ADNOC completed "the largest block placement of a publicly listed" company in the Gulf region valued at $1 billion. The placement, which was aimed at institutional investors, increased the subsidiary's free float to 20%.

Abu Dhabi Crude Oil Pipeline LLC (ADCOP) 
ADCOP owns approximately 406 km pipeline that carries crude oil from an ADNOC Onshore collection center in Abu Dhabi to the Fujairah oil export terminal, which provides access to international shipping routes.

Education

ADNOC Technical Academy (ATA) 

The ADNOC Technical Academy (ATA) provides specialist training and education for UAE Nationals who want to become skilled oil and gas industry technicians.

See also 
 Emirates National Oil Company (ENOC)
 International Petroleum Investment Company
 List of oil exploration and production companies
Mubadala Investment Company
Abu Dhabi Investment Authority

References

External links
 
ADQ Holding Company

Oil and gas companies of the United Arab Emirates
UAE
Government-owned companies of the United Arab Emirates
Companies based in Abu Dhabi
Energy companies established in 1971
Non-renewable resource companies established in 1971
Emirati companies established in 1971